The National Shrine of Our Lady of the Snows is a Catholic shrine to the Blessed Virgin Mary in Belleville, Illinois, nine miles southeast of St. Louis, Missouri. The Shrine's director is the Reverend Father Salvador Gonzalez, OMI. The shrine is in the Roman Catholic Diocese of Belleville, but it is operated by the United States Province of the Missionary Oblates of Mary Immaculate. The Shrine name refers to the Basilica of Saint Mary Major in Rome, where legend says snow fell in the summertime.

History
Devotion to Our Lady of the Snows was first introduced to the Midwest in 1941 by missioner by Father Paul Schulte, OMI. A small corner shrine was set up in a chapel at St. Henry's seminary in Belleville. In 1943 the Oblates began to hold a novena in honor of Our Lady of the Snows.

The shrine was designed by sculptor William C. Severson and architect Richard Cummings.

Work on the shrine began in 1958 after Schulte had been developing the idea for years. By 1963, the shrine's reflecting pool had already been completed. The pool is lined with bells that were originally cast in Germany from a demolished Chicago church.

Facililties 
The shrine includes a restaurant, a hotel, an apartment complex for retired persons, a residence for the Oblates, a visitors and conference center, and a large gift shop. During Advent and Christmas, the Shrine hosts the "Way of Lights", an outdoor light display that features over 1.1 million white lights and attracts over 350,000 visitors annually. Visitors can travel the mile-and-a-half-long "Way of Lights" by car, in a heated trolley or in a horse-drawn carriage. During the Summer months, people from all over the World gather to worship and pray during the Our Lady of the Snows Healing and Hope Novena.

The Shrine also includes a church, a natural outdoor amphitheater, Stations of the Cross, a Resurrection Garden, a depiction of the Lourdes Grotto, an Annunciation Garden and a devotional site for Our Lady of Guadalupe. In January 2021, the Shrine Guesthouse went under renovation and had its interior painted. Facilities are available to rent for weddings, conferences, conventions, and events.

The Oblates make possible a number of spiritual and family programs for the enrichment of the local community, for the Midwest region, and for North America. The Shrine's Youth Ministry, Adult Spirituality, Hispanic Ministry, Liturgy, and Events Departments host a variety of programs year-round, tailored to meet the needs of the Shrine's many pilgrims.

The Shrine Restaurant & Banquet Center closed in 2020 as a result of the COVID-19 pandemic following a $70,000 renovation effort in early 2020.

References

External links
National Shrine of Our Lady of the Snows
Missionary Oblates of Mary Immaculate

Shrines to the Virgin Mary
Churches in St. Clair County, Illinois
Buildings and structures in Belleville, Illinois
Roman Catholic national shrines in the United States
Churches in the Roman Catholic Diocese of Belleville
Tourist attractions in St. Clair County, Illinois